Schwartz Peak is a rock peak 15 nautical miles (28 km) east-southeast of FitzGerald Bluffs in Palmer Land. The peak is one in a chain of small summits lying southeastward of the bluffs and is the dominant feature near the center of the group. It was discovered and photographed on November 23, 1935, by Lincoln Ellsworth. Mapped by United States Geological Survey (USGS) from surveys and U.S. Navy air photos, 1961–66. Named by Advisory Committee on Antarctic Names (US-ACAN) for Bruce L. Schwartz, USGS Topographic Engineer in Antarctica, 1967–68.

Mountains of Palmer Land